Reiji Hirata (Japanese: 平田 礼次; born in Japan) is a Japanese football manager who now works as the Head of Youth Development of Philippine Football Federation.

Career

Chinese Taipei U16
Hirata started his managerial career with the Chinese Taipei national under-16 football team.

Chinese Taipei
In 2017, he was appointed head coach of the Chinese Taipei national football team, a position he held until 2017.

Philippines youth
In 2018, he was appointed as the Head of Youth Development of Philippine Football Federation.

Philippines U-19
Hirata coached the Philippines U-19 in the 2018 AFF U-19 Youth Championship held in Indonesia.

Philippines U-17
A month later, Hirata led the Philippines U-17 in the 2018 AFF U-16 Youth Championship. The tournament was also held in Indonesia.

References

External links 
 From the Asian Pitch ~JFA Official Overseas Dispatch Leader Message~ 34th Reiji Hirata Philippine Football Federation Youth Development Director 
 Japanese coach impressed with rise of football in Mindanao
 Reproduction of Japanese Experience Hirata Rei guides the development of Taichung Football
 Men's football team change should be left to Hirata Reji 
 Rei Hirata: I want to stay in Taiwan

Living people
Japanese football managers
Chinese Taipei national football team managers
1975 births